Stadion Luke is a football stadium located in Visoko, Bosnia and Herzegovina. It is the home ground of NK Bosna Visoko. It's located in a part of the city called Luke. The previous stadium name was Stadion April 7th. The capacity of the stadium is 5,200 seats.

In addition to the main football field, there is an auxiliary terrain full of competitive dimensions with high quality artificial grass, and LED lighting. This field serves both for trainings and matches of youth teams and the first team.

External links
Stadion Luke at europlan-online.de

NK Bosna Visoko
Architecture in Bosnia and Herzegovina
l
Football venues in Yugoslavia
Buildings and structures in Visoko
Sport in Visoko